Hibernia Express is a submarine communications cable system which was privately owned by Hibernia Networks linking Canada, Ireland, and the UK. Hibernia Express is now owned by telecommunications provider GTT Communications, Inc. after their acquisition of Hibernia Networks. At 58.95ms of latency, the cable is currently the lowest latency fiber optic route between the NY4 data center in Secaucus, New Jersey and London.

The cable was considered operational on September 15, 2015. Hibernia Express spans 4,600 km between its landing stations in Halifax, Nova Scotia; Brean, UK; and Cork, Ireland. The cable is constructed with 6 fiber pairs, with a design capacity for 53 Tbit/s.

During the planning phases of the cable, Hibernia Networks intended to use Huawei as the contractor for construction of the cable. Due to security concerns from the potential customers of the cable, Huawei was not used and the construction contract went to TE Subcom (owned by TE Connectivity).

References

Transatlantic communications cables
Submarine communications cables in the North Atlantic Ocean
2015 establishments in Nova Scotia
2015 establishments in England
2015 establishments in Ireland